Gessate is a suburban station on Line 2 of the Milan Metro serving the town of Gessate.

History
The station was opened 13 April 1985, as the terminus of the extension from Gorgonzola. From 26 July to 31 August 2014 Gessate station was closed for the construction of the Outer Ring Road east of Milan. The trains have limited service to Cascina Antonietta, temporary terminus.

References

Line 2 (Milan Metro) stations
Railway stations opened in 1985
1985 establishments in Italy
Railway stations in Italy opened in the 20th century